Daphne Akhurst defeated Esna Boyd 7–5, 6–2, in the final to win the women's singles tennis title at the 1928 Australian Championships.

Seeds
The seeded players are listed below. Daphne Akhurst is the champion; others show the round in which they were eliminated.

  Esna Boyd (finalist)
  Daphne Akhurst (champion)
  Louie Bickerton (semifinals)
  Sylvia Harper (second round)

Draw

Key
 Q = Qualifier
 WC = Wild card
 LL = Lucky loser
 r = Retired

Finals

Earlier rounds

Section 1

Section 2

See also
 1928 Australian Championships – Men's singles

Notes

 In an original draw  Le Messurier and Weston – both representatives of South Australia – have been drawn together in the first round (Freudenstein received a bye into the second round to play against Waterhouse). This was protested by the South Australian Council as being against the regulations.
 This is most confusing one. No source gives an information about such a draw, let alone the result.

References

External links
 
  Source for seedings

1928 in women's tennis
1928
1928 in Australian tennis
1928 in Australian women's sport
Women's Singles